Hans Peter Eugster (November 19, 1925 in Igis, Switzerland – December 17, 1987 in Baltimore, USA) was a Swiss-American geochemist, mineralogist, and petrologist.

Education 
Eugster studied at ETH Zurich with Diplom in 1948 and D.Sc. in 1951 under Paul Niggli with a dissertation on metamorphic recrystallization in the eastern part of the Aar massif. As a postdoctoral fellow, Eugster studied optical spectroscopy from 1951 to 1952 at the Massachusetts Institute of Technology, where he was also influenced by research on petrology done by James Burleigh Thompson's team at Harvard University.

Career 
Eugster then went to the Geophysical Laboratory of the Carnegie Institution in Washington, DC. There, from 1952 to 1958, he studied experimental mineralogy under Hatten Yoder, specializing in high temperatures and aqueous fluid pressures.

He investigated the Green River Formation, later followed by worldwide investigations of other salt deposits. He became in 1958 Associate Professor of Experimental Petrology at Johns Hopkins University and in 1960 Professor. From 1983 to 1987 he was the director of the Faculty of Geosciences. He was also an adjunct professor at the University of Wyoming from 1970 onwards. He died unexpectedly from an aortic rupture.

Awards and honors 
He was elected in 1972 a member of the United States National Academy of Sciences and, in the same year, a fellow of the American Academy of Arts and Sciences. He received in 1983 the Roebling Medal, in 1976 the V. M. Goldschmidt Award, and in 1971 the Arthur L. Day Medal. In 1985 he was president of the Mineralogical Society of America.

The salt mineral eugsterite from Lake Victoria in Kenya was named after him in 1981.

Personal life 
His brother  was a chemist and professor at the University of Zurich. He was married to Elaine Koppelman.

Selected works
 Heterogeneous reactions involving oxidation and reduction at high pressures and temperatures, J. Chem. Phys., Vol. 26, 1957, pp. 1760–1761
 with Charles Milton: Mineral assemblages in the Green River Formation, in P.H. Abelson, Researches in Geochemistry, Wiley 1959, pp. 18–150
 Reduction and Oxidation in Metamorphism, in P.H. Abelson, Researches in Geochemistry, Wiley 1959, pp. 397–426
 with B.M. French. Experimental control of oxygen fugacities by graphite-gas equilibriums, J. Geophys. Res., Vol. 70, 1965, pp. 1529–1539.
 with D.R. Wones: Stability of Biotite: Experiment, Theory, and Application., American Mineralogist, Vol. 50, 1965, pp. 1228–1272.
 with J. L. Munoz: Experimental control of fluorine reactions in hydrothermal systems. American Mineralogist, Vol. 54, 1969, pp. 943–959.
 with L.A. Hardie: The Evolution of Closed Basin Brines, Mineralogical Society of America Special Publ., 3, 1970, pp. 273–290
 The Beginnings of Experimental Petrology, Science, Vol. 173, 1971, pp. 481–489
 with C.E. Harvie, J.H. Weare, L. A. Hardie. Evaporation of sea water: Calculated mineral sequences, Science, Vol. 208, 1980, pp. 498–500.
 Oil shales, evaporites and ore deposits. Geochim. et Cosmochim. Acta, Vol. 49, 1985, pp. 619–635.
 with R.J. Spencer, B.F. Jones, S.L. Rettig: Geochemistry of Great Salt Lake, Utah, Part 1, 2, Geochim. et Cosmochim. Acta, Vol. 49, 1985, pp. 727–737, 739–774

References

External links
 

American mineralogists
American geochemists
Swiss mineralogists
Geochemists
Petrologists
Johns Hopkins University faculty
Fellows of the American Academy of Arts and Sciences
Members of the United States National Academy of Sciences
1925 births
1987 deaths
Recipients of the V. M. Goldschmidt Award